Ely is the largest city and county seat of White Pine County, Nevada, United States. Ely was founded as a stagecoach station along the Pony Express and Central Overland Route. In 1906 copper was discovered. Ely's mining boom came later than the other towns along US 50. The railroads connecting the transcontinental railroad to the mines in Austin, Nevada and Eureka, Nevada have long been removed, but the railroad to Ely is preserved as a heritage railway by the Nevada Northern Railway and known as the Ghost Train of Old Ely. As of the 2020 census, the population was 3,924.

History

In 1878, Vermont resident J. W. Long came to White Pine County and soon set up a camp known as "Ely", after discovering gold. The name "Ely" has been credited to several possible origins: Long's hometown of Ely, Vermont; a New York Congressman with the surname Ely, who sent Long as a representative according to local historians; Smith Ely, a Vermont native who financed one of the city's early mineral operations; and John Ely, an Illinois native who came to Nevada for mining.

Ely was founded as a stagecoach station along the Pony Express and Central Overland Route. Ely's mining boom came later than the other towns along US 50, with the discovery of copper in 1906. This made Ely a mining town, suffering through the boom-and-bust cycles so common in the West. Originally, Ely was home to a number of copper mining companies, Kennecott Utah Copper being the most famous. With a crash in the copper market in the mid-1970s, Kennecott shut down and copper mining disappeared (temporarily).

With the advent of cyanide heap leaching—a method of extracting gold from what was previously considered very low-grade ore—the next boom was on. Many companies processed the massive piles of "overburden" that had been removed from copper mines, or expanded the existing open-pit mines to extract the gold ore. Gold mines as widespread as the Robinson project near Ruth, and AmSelco's Alligator Ridge mine  from Ely, kept the town alive during the 1980s and 1990s, until the recent revival of copper mining.

As Kennecott's smelter was demolished, copper concentrate from the mine is now shipped by rail to Seattle, where it is transported to Japan for smelting. The dramatic increase in demand for copper in 2005 has once again made Ely a copper boom town.

The now-defunct BHP Nevada Railroad ran from the mining district south of Ruth through Ely to the junction with the Union Pacific at Shafter from 1996 to 1999.

Geography and climate

Ely experiences a semi-arid climate (Köppen BSk), and extreme day-night temperature differences year-round. On average, the first and last dates of freezing temperatures are September 8 and June 18, respectively, allowing a growing season of only 79 days. Frosts have occurred in every month, even July. The diurnal temperature range of Ely is so great due to its elevation, dry air, clear skies, and location in a valley, allowing for intense radiative cooling at sunset, even after hot summer days.

The most snowfall in a season has been  from July 2010 to June 2011 and the least  from July 1950 to June 1951.

Demographics

As of the census of 2000, there were 4,041 people, 1,727 households, and 1,065 families residing in the city. The population density was 567 people per square mile (219/km). There were 2,205 housing units at an average density of 309 per square mile (119/km). The racial makeup of the city was 89.14% White, 0.32% African American, 3.12% Native American, 1.09% Asian, 0.35% Pacific Islander, 3.71% from other races, and 2.28% from two or more races. Hispanic or Latino of any race were 12.35% of the population.

There were 1,727 households, out of which 28.6% had children under the age of 18 living with them, 46.4% were married couples living together, 10.2% had a female householder with no husband present, and 38.3% were non-families. 33.7% of all households were made up of individuals, and 13.1% had someone living alone who was 65 years of age or older. The average household size was 2.30 and the average family size was 2.94.

In the city, the population was spread out, with 25.7% under the age of 18, 6.3% from 18 to 24, 23.8% from 25 to 44, 27.0% from 45 to 64, and 17.2% who were 65 years of age or older. The median age was 41 years. For every 100 females, there were 98 males. For every 100 females age 18 and over, there were 96 males.

The median income for a household in the city was $36,408, and the median income for a family was $42,168. Males had a median income of $36,016 versus $26,597 for females. The per capita income for the city was $17,013. About 11% of families and 12% of the population were below the poverty line, including 12% of those under age 18 and 9% of those aged 65 or over.

Economy

Tourism

Ely is a tourism center, and is home of the Nevada Northern Railway Museum. 
The railroad museum features the Ghost Train of Old Ely, a working steam-engine passenger train that travels the historic tracks from Ely to the Robinson mining district.

Ely is the nearest city to the proposed site of the Clock of the Long Now on Mount Washington.

The historic six-story Hotel Nevada and Gambling Hall is in downtown Ely. Opened in 1929, it was the tallest building in Nevada until 1931 and was the state's first fire-proof building. It is a popular lodging, dining, gaming, and tourist stop.

The long stretch of road on State Route 318 near Ely is known for the annual  Silver State Classic Challenge course, an authorized time-trial Cannonball Run-style race that attracts entries from all over the world.

The Ely Renaissance Society is responsible for more than 20 outdoor murals and sculptures in the downtown area. Artists from all over the world have been commissioned to create images of area history, using different art styles. They also maintain a historical village consisting of a general store and several shotgun houses which display the history of the people that came to the area to work for the railroad and the mine.

Ely is also home to regional offices of the U.S. Bureau of Land Management, U.S. Forest Service, and Nevada Department of Wildlife, all of which have information and staff to help visitors enjoy the rich natural resources of the area.

Outdoors and recreation
Nearby are Great Basin National Park, Cave Lake State Park, the Ward Charcoal Ovens State Historic Park, and the state parks of Lincoln County, Nevada.

The vast open spaces around Ely are popular with hikers, mountain bikers and cross country skiers.

Ely was the host of the 2016 National Speleological Society's annual convention.
The Bureau of Land Management, operates an area supporting an elk herd south of town. The Ely Elk Viewing Area offers visitors the opportunity to see an elk community up close.

Mining

Starting in 1867, iron-rich gossans were mined for precious metals in Lane Valley west of Ely. The Aultman and Saxton Mines were operating by the 1870s. The Chainman Mine was developed by the 1890s and became the most productive in the area. Starting in 1903, copper was mined by the Giroux Consolidated Mining Company and by the Nevada Consolidated Copper Company in 1904. In 1913, Consolidated Copper Mines Company took over Giroux.
 
In 1936, Fulton and Smith first described magnesite, yet by 1942, when deposits were first studied no magnesite mining existed.

In 1943, Kennecott Copper Corporation took over Nevada Consolidated and by 1958 had consolidated all of the properties in the district.

KGHM International Ltd. owns a large copper mine, formerly owned by Quadra FNX, employing 510 people near Ely.

The Joana Mine in Robinson Canyon, 2 miles North of Ely, has exposed a limestone geologic formation named the Joana Limestone after the mine.

Sports
From 2006 through 2014, the UNLV Rebels football team of the University of Nevada, Las Vegas held training camp in Ely.

Infrastructure

Air
Commercial air service was available at Ely Airport until March 31, 2013. In 2011, the Ely Airport was frequently cited as one of the rural airports receiving federal subsidies through the Essential Air Service program.

Roads
 U.S. Route 6
 U.S. Route 50 (Ely is the eastern end of the portion of U.S. Route 50 known as "The Loneliest Road in America")
 U.S. Route 93
The  historic Lincoln Highway, the first road across America, went through Ely, entering town from the north on U.S. Route 93 and departing town to the west on U.S. Route 50.

Education
Ely has a public library, a branch of the White Pine County Library. Ely is part of the White Pine County School District.

Media
Ely's local newspaper is The Ely Times. Ely has two local radio stations: KDSS (92.7 FM) and KELY (1230 AM). KELY is heard across much of rural Nevada as the flagship of the Nevada Talk Network. Salt Lake City's KSFI radio station is also broadcast in Ely, at 95.3 FM.

Notable people
 Albert J. Carpenter (9 June 1911 - 21 June 1999), officer in the United States Coast Guard from 1933 to 1968

 Helen Delich Bentley - born to Yugoslavian parents and graduating from Ely High School, she was appointed by Richard Nixon to lead the Federal Maritime Regulatory Agency in 1969. She served as a representative for Maryland in the US Congress from 1985 to 1995.  

 Patricia Nixon - Former first lady of the United States was born in Ely.  Her father was a miner in the area and the family left when Patricia was two years old.  Pat and her husband Richard Nixon visited the area during his 1952 vice-presidential campaign.

In popular culture
 Operation Haylift (1950), by director William A. Berke, is about a historical event that took place in White Pine County.
 Lust for Freedom (1987), a film directed by Eric Louzil.
 Once Upon a Texas Train (1988), a television film directed by Burt Kennedy.
 Roadside Prophets (1992), an independent film directed by Abbe Wool.
 Guncrazy (1992), a film directed by Tamra Davis and starring Drew Barrymore.
 Rat Race (2001), a film directed by Jerry Zucker, with its climactic scene shot in and around the restored train depot of the railway museum.
 "Laying Low in Eli, Nevada" (2005), a song performed by David Dondero for his South of the South album.
 My Blueberry Nights (2007), a film directed by Wong Kar-wai.
 "Ely Nevada" (2008), a song performed by Ry Cooder for the My Blueberry Nights soundtrack.
 Play Dead (2009), a film directed by Jason Wiles.
Paul (2011), Ely was portrayed in the film as the two main characters stopped for gas

See also 

 Northern Hotel

References

External links

 City of Ely, Nevada
 Ely, Nevada website – White Pine Tourism and Recreation Board
 Official State of Nevada Tourism Site
 Exploring Nevada – Photographs of Ely and Surrounding Area
 Discoverely.com Ely-related website for travelers and visitors – with HD video.
 Road Trip USA page about Ely

 
Cities in White Pine County, Nevada
County seats in Nevada
Pony Express stations
1878 establishments in Utah Territory
Cities in Nevada
Populated places established in 1878